Whisky Creek is a stream in Wilkin County, in the U.S. state of Minnesota. It is a tributary of the Red River of the North.

Whisky Creek was so named for the fact bootleg whisky was sold near this creek.

See also
List of rivers of Minnesota

References

Rivers of Wilkin County, Minnesota
Rivers of Minnesota